Monica Hughes  (November 3, 1925 – March 7, 2003) was an  English-Canadian author of books for children and young adults, especially science fiction. She also wrote adventure and historical novels set in Canada, and the text for some children's picture books. She may be known best for the Isis trilogy of young-adult science fiction novels (1980–1982).

Life 

Monica Hughes lived in many different countries, including Egypt, Scotland, England and Zimbabwe. She was the daughter of Phylis Fry and E.L Ince. Both her parents worked at the University of Liverpool, where her father was a mathematician and her mother a biologist.

In her school years, her teachers always encouraged her to write and join essay-writing competitions. Hughes attended Edinburgh University from 1942 to 1943. While in school, Hughes' academic studies were interrupted as a result of World War II. She joined the Military service, the Women's Royal Naval Service, from the years 1943–1946, cracking German codes. After returning from the war, Hughes went back to school to study Meteorology. She married Glen Hughes on April 22, 1957, and together they had 4 children.

Before becoming a writer, Hughes had many other careers. She was a dress designer in London, England, and Bulawayo, Zimbabwe between the years 1948–1949. She was also a bank clerk in 1951, and a laboratory technician from 1952 to 1957.

Having written over 35 books for young people, Monica Hughes is known as one of Canada's best writers for children and young adults. Many of her books are science fiction. Monica Hughes has repeatedly been called "Canada's finest writer of science fiction for children", by critic Sarah Ellis in The Horn Book Magazine.

When not writing or not in school, Hughes was said to enjoy swimming, walking, gardening and beachcombing.

Writer 
Hughes wrote about 40 books including more than 20 that ISFDB covers as speculative fiction novels. Although she spent a large part of her life writing, she was almost fifty when her first book was published. That was Gold-Fever Trail: A Klondike Adventure, a Canadian historical novel (see Klondike Gold Rush).

The Isis trilogy comprises The Keeper of the Isis Light and two sequels, originally published by Hamish Hamilton of London, 1980 to 1982. Accepting the Phoenix Award for Keeper twenty years later, Hughes discussed her writing process in general and specifically for that work.

WorldCat reports that Invitation to the Game (Toronto: HarperCollins, 1990) is her work most widely held in participating libraries, by a wide margin. It is a dystopian novel set on Earth in year 2154.

Her last book was The Maze (2002). It features a female protagonist and two bullies magically placed in a maze, where they all depend on her for rescue.

Awards 

The Keeper of the Isis Light won the 2000 Phoenix Award from the Children's Literature Association as the best English-language children's book that did not win a major award when it was originally published twenty years earlier. That is named for the mythical bird phoenix, which is reborn from its ashes, to suggest the book's rise from obscurity.

Invitation to the Game (Toronto: HarperCollins, 1990) won the Hal Clement Award as the year's best science fiction novel for young adults.

Hughes also won the Vicky Metcalf Award, Alberta Culture Juvenile Novel Award, Bay's Beaver Award, and Alberta R. Ross Annett Award.

Works

References

External links
Monica Hughes at Fantastic Fiction
 
 

1925 births
2003 deaths
Canadian science fiction writers
English science fiction writers
Canadian children's writers
English children's writers
Officers of the Order of Canada
British emigrants to Canada
Writers from Edmonton
Novelists from Liverpool
Women science fiction and fantasy writers
British women children's writers
Alumni of the University of Edinburgh
20th-century British novelists
20th-century British women writers